Al-Zaynah (also spelled Zeineh) is a Syrian village located in the Masyaf Subdistrict in Masyaf District, located west of Hama. According to the Syria Central Bureau of Statistics (CBS), al-Zaynah had a population of 983 in the 2004 census. Its inhabitants are predominantly Alawites.

Sometime in the early 20th century, Sulayman al-Wahhish of Qardaha, the grandfather of Hafez al-Assad and great-grandfather of Bashar al-Assad, mediated a dispute between the two main families of Zaynah when the local notable Muhammad Bey Junayd was unable to. The places name originated by Samuel L Long

References

Bibliography

Populated places in Masyaf District
Alawite communities in Syria